Scott Buchanan, known online as pannenkoek2012, often shortened to pannenkoek (is a Super Mario 64 analyst and YouTube personality. Pannenkoek2012 is known for creating highly technical videos detailing the mechanics of Super Mario 64, in which he explains techniques he uses to beat levels of the game while completing various self-imposed challenges such as not using certain buttons or the joystick when completing objectives in the game. He is best known for his work on the "A-Button Challenge", which aims to fully complete the game while pressing the A button the fewest number of times possible as a proof of concept. This is a significant task, as the A-button is primarily used for jumping, which is integral to platform games like Super Mario 64, and a normal run-through of the game can be expected to take hundreds of A-presses.

In 2014, he received media attention for collecting a coin previously thought unobtainable in the level "Tiny-Huge Island". In 2015, he offered a US$1,000 bounty for anyone who could recreate a specific glitch in Super Mario 64, which as of 2023 has yet to be claimed.

Super Mario 64 videos
Super Mario 64 was the first video game pannenkoek2012 played as a child. In 2013, while still in college, where he majored in computer science, pannenkoek2012 started uploading videos of him reaching Super Mario 64 objectives without jumping, to his pannenkoek2012 YouTube channel. Though Mario's primary skill is considered to be jumping from platform to platform, pannenkoek2012 attempted to clear the entirety of Super Mario 64—without pressing the A-button (the jump button)—by using the game's environmental hazards and various glitches.

Pannenkoek2012 has produced a large number of in-depth YouTube videos deconstructing the mechanics of Super Mario 64, which have been described as esoteric "programming lessons". In one video, pannenkoek2012 explains how a player can manipulate the random number generator of Super Mario 64 by kicking up dust in a certain way. Despite the highly technical nature of these videos, he regularly amasses hundreds of thousands of views on his main channel by making them digestible to the layperson. As of 4 January 2023, six of his videos have been seen a million or more times, and his most-watched video has 4.5 million views.

He also operates a second channel, UncommentatedPannen, where he uploads raw footage without commentary. He does not upload videos to his main channel if they fail to meet the high standards he has set for it.

A-Button Challenge

The bulk of pannenkoek2012's videos focus on the "A-Button Challenge", which aims to fully complete Super Mario 64 while pressing the A button as few times as possible. This is significant because the A button, which makes Mario jump, is one of the fundamental game mechanics of Super Mario 64, a game that has been described as "about jumping". In one video, pannenkoek2012 showed that he was able to collect the "Mario Wings to the Sky" objective without pressing the A button by exploiting glitches that enabled him to "clone" a large amount of Goombas to form a ladder. This took two years of planning to achieve and the video took 55 hours to make.

On January 12, 2016, pannenkoek2012 uploaded a commentated video in which he explained how to complete the "Watch for Rolling Rocks" objective in 0.5 A-presses. This strategy originally took 14.8 hours in-game from start to finish, most of which were spent using a glitch to accelerate Mario to the speeds necessary for the "parallel universe" movement (millions of units per second), but was reduced to 5.4 hours in 2017. The video became widely spoofed online for its highly-technical terminology, especially his "half A-press" notation (not using the entire utility of the press by beginning the level with the A button held down) and his use of "parallel universes" (a collision glitch caused by integer overflow).

In August 2013, when pannenkoek2012 began working on the A-Button Challenge, 211 A-presses were required to complete Super Mario 64. As of February 2023, a 120-star playthrough of Super Mario 64 can be completed in as few as 13 A-presses.

Impossible coins
In June 2014, pannenkoek2012 collected what was known as "the impossible coin", an item hidden in the "Tiny-Huge Island" level of Super Mario 64 that was deemed impossible to reach. In 2002, the coin was discovered by a GameFAQs Super Mario 64 message board member named Josiah. The coin was placed underneath the ground, likely by one of the game's developers by accident. Considered unobtainable, pannenkoek2012 managed to collect it using tool assistance by jumping and kicking on a single frame while moving out of water. Pannenkoek2012 noted that it should be possible to collect the coin without tool assistance, but he added that doing so would be highly difficult and require a lot of practice.

In the Super Mario 64 level "Bowser in the Sky", pannenkoek2012 discovered a misplaced Goomba located at the bottom of the level, which he dubbed the "Mystery Goomba". Since Goombas drop a coin once killed, and the enemy currently seems to be impossible to kill, he called the Mystery Goomba's held coin the "new" impossible coin. In October 2016, pannenkoek2012 discovered another impossible coin in "Tiny-Huge Island". The enlarged version of the course was found to have a line of four coins, even though all other lines of coins in Super Mario 64 contain five coins. He showed that there was a fifth coin that activates a failsafe that no other coin in the game activates, causing it to be immediately removed from play, leaving only four coins in the line.

Other videos
In August 2015, Twitch streamer DOTA_TeaBag encountered a glitch in the Super Mario 64 level "Tick Tock Clock" in which Mario suddenly teleports significantly upwards. The "upwarp", as it is described, caught pannenkoek2012's attention, as finding out how the glitch was performed and being able to reliably replicate it in other areas could allow players to skip large sections of the game or complete the game with fewer uses of the A button. Pannenkoek2012 offered a US$1,000 prize to anyone who could recreate the upwarp glitch and send gameplay data to him without modifying the game's files. The bounty has not been successfully claimed, though the glitch's effect can be replicated by changing a single bit of memory pertaining to Mario's height on a certain frame. As no method of changing this bit has been found, it is speculated that a stray cosmic ray caused the bit to change, making the glitch an extremely improbable event.

Pannenkoek2012 started working on a video detailing the workings of Super Mario 64s geometry in summer 2016. He eventually finished this video in May 2017, releasing it under the title "Walls, Floors, & Ceilings". The video details how Mario's movement is measured in the game – which varies depending on whether Mario is located on the ground, in the air, or in water – and how the character interacts with the hitboxes of objects along the way. Pannenkoek2012 noted that he considers the information in this video "extremely important", as he has been using this information to help him execute or dismiss strategies for years. Gamasutra described this video as a "passionate delve into the most granular details of level design". Since then pannenkoek2012 has released two more videos on this subject, titled "Walls, Floors, & Ceilings Part 2" and "Walls, Floors, & Ceilings Part 3", respectively. These videos contain more in-depth analysis of how the mechanics of hitboxes work.

In March 2019, pannenkoek2012 uploaded a large number of "No Joystick Allowed" videos in which he completes levels in Super Mario 64 without moving Mario with the controller's analog stick.

Notes

References

External links

UncommentatedPannen

1990s births
Living people
Mario players
YouTube channels